The Lizzie Borden House is notorious for being the home of Lizzie Borden and her family, and it is the location of the 1892 unsolved double murder of Lizzie's father and stepmother Andrew and Abby Borden. It is located on 230 Second Street in the city of Fall River, Massachusetts.

History

From 1872 to 1892, the house was the property of Andrew Borden, Lizzie's father, who was a member of Fall River high society. After Lizzie's trial and acquittal for murdering her father and stepmother in the home, she bought another house located at 7 French Street that she named 'Maplecroft'. Lizzie lived there until her death on June 1, 1927. The house number of 92 Second Street was changed to 230 in 1896.

Recent history
It has operated as a bed and breakfast since 1996 under the ownership of Martha McGinn who inherited the house. Martha's grandparents purchased the house on August 4, 1948. According to Martha McGinn, the room where Lizzie's stepmother Abby Borden was found murdered is the "most requested room" of the bedrooms at the bed and breakfast. The Fall River Historical Society promotes the Lizzie Borden bed and breakfast as a tourist attraction.

Tours of the house often make reference to the possibility of ghostly activity, and in their book The Ghost Chronicles, self-proclaimed "medium" Maureen Wood and self-proclaimed "paranormal scientist" Ron Kolek describe experiencing ghostly events in the house.  However, investigator of claims of the paranormal Joe Nickell reports that these claims are based upon either unverifiable personal feelings of a ghostly presence or the use of well-known and well-understood techniques like table-tipping that, like ouija board and dowsing rod effects, involve the ideomotor effect rather than the presence of a ghostly spirit.

The house was listed for sale in 2021 and was sold to Lance Zaal for $2 million. Zaal stated he would keep the property operating as a bed-and-breakfast and hoped to expand the business to include other Lizzie-Borden-themed activities in the future.

In popular culture
"Thin Lizzie", a 2015 episode of  The CW series Supernatural (season 11, episode 5) involved a series of murders centered on the Lizzie Borden House Bed & Breakfast. It, however, does not depict the actual outside of the house nor the people working inside it favorably. 

Nuka World, an expansion pack for the 2015 post-apocalyptic video game Fallout 4 features a house that resembles the Winchester Mystery House where a narrator tells the story of a young girl named Lucy who murdered her parents.

See also
 A. J. Borden Building

References

Houses in Fall River, Massachusetts
Reportedly haunted locations in Massachusetts